William J. Casey was the Director of Central Intelligence.

William, Willie, or Bill Casey may also refer to:

Sports

Gaelic football
 Bill Casey (Gaelic footballer) (1918–1999), Irish Gaelic footballer
 Willie Casey (Gaelic footballer) (1932–2016), Irish Gaelic footballer
 Bill Casey (Dublin Gaelic footballer) (born 1939), Irish Gaelic footballer

Other sports
 Bill Casey (Australian footballer) (1872–1915), Australian rules footballer
 Mickey Casey (William Cofer Casey, 1905–1968), American baseball player
 William Casey (bobsleigh) (fl. 1940s), American bobsledder
 Willie Casey (born 1981), Irish professional boxer

Others
 William Casey (bishop) (died 1591), Anglican bishop in Ireland
 Father William Casey, who established Father Casey's GAA in 1884
 William Francis Casey (1884–1957), journalist and editor of The Times
 William Casey (Kentucky politician) (1754–1816), American politician, settler, and military officer
 William J. Casey (Massachusetts politician) (1905–1992), American politician
 Bill Casey (born 1945), Canadian politician
 William H. Casey (born 1955), American professor of chemistry and of geology

See also
 Casey (disambiguation)
 William (disambiguation)
 William Case (disambiguation)